Camille François is a French researcher working on digital disinformation and cyber security, and the chief innovation officer at Graphika, a company providing insights on social media landscapes. She tracks how states are using social media for disinformation and misinformation.

Some of her research focused on individual accounts from people working for troll farms such as the Internet Research Agency, and she provided testimonies on Russian electoral influence operations for the United States Senate Select Committee on Intelligence.

Education and career 
François holds a master's degree from the Paris Institute of Political Studies and a master's degree in international security from Columbia University in 2013. She worked at Jigsaw, a unit within Google dedicated to exploring threats to open societies. She is a Fulbright fellow and served as the special advisor to the CTO of France within the prime minister's office.

She was featured as a Time 100 Next fellow in 2019 and as an innovator under 35 by theTechnology Review.

She is an affiliate of the Berkman-Klein Center for Internet & Society at Harvard University and joined Niantic in 2021 as their global director of trust & safety.

References 

Sciences Po alumni
Columbia University alumni
Year of birth missing (living people)
Living people